The 2013 Volta Limburg Classic was the 40th edition of the Volta Limburg Classic cycle race and was held on 30 March 2013. The race started and finished in Eijsden. The race was won by Rüdiger Selig.

General classification

References

2013
2013 in road cycling
2013 in Dutch sport